The Maytag Aircraft Building is a historical building located on 701 S, Cascade Avenue in Colorado Springs, Colorado that was built in 1957. It was added to the US National Register of Historic Places (NRHP) on January 16, 2008.

The buildings' name is derived from a Colorado Springs company that was headquartered in the building from 1957 to 1992.

References

Buildings and structures in Colorado Springs, Colorado
Colorado State Register of Historic Properties
Commercial buildings on the National Register of Historic Places in Colorado
National Register of Historic Places in Colorado Springs, Colorado
1950s architecture in the United States
Modernist architecture in Colorado